The Corpus Christi Museum of Science and History is a science and history museum in Corpus Christi, Texas, near Corpus Christi Harbor Bridge and the waterfront. It was established in 1957. Among its many displays covering an area of over 40,000 square feet are many artifacts found in the wreck of the Spanish ship San Estaban, including the world's oldest mariner's astrolabe with a confirmed date of 1554. An extension to the museum opened in May 1990 to house the Shipwreck! exhibition.

References

External links
Official site

Science museums in Texas
History museums in Texas
Buildings and structures in Corpus Christi, Texas
Museums established in 1957
1957 establishments in Texas
Museums in Nueces County, Texas
Tourist attractions in Corpus Christi, Texas